Lophocampa alsus is a moth of the family Erebidae. It was described by Pieter Cramer in 1777. It is found in Suriname and possibly Colombia and Venezuela.

References

Lophocampa alsus at BOLD Systems

Moths described in 1777
alsus